The Copper, or The Grasper, is a 1930 British-German crime film directed by Richard Eichberg and starring Hans Albers, Charlotte Susa, and Margot Landa. It is the German-language version of the British film Night Birds, which was also directed by Eichberg but with an English-speaking cast. Both films were made by British International Pictures at their Elstree Studios at a time when such multiple-language versions were common.

It was a success in Germany, launching Albers as a major star. In 1958, the film was remade with Albers reprising his role.

Plot 
Scotland Yard's Sergeant Harry Cross investigates a brazen robbery at a London mansion in which a large dinner party was robbed of all their jewelry and valuables. A servant was stabbed with a throwing knife. Sergeant Cross and Chief Inspector Warrington immediately suspect Messer-Jack and his gang to be behind the robbery-murder. For some time now, they have been terrifying the residents of London with their brutal acts.

A five-pound gaming chip found at the scene leads Cross to the Palermo nightclub. He suspects that the gaming chip came from a backroom gaming club. He asks around there and makes unwelcome acquaintances with Toothpick Jeff and Whiskey Dick, who feel disturbed by him playing. As Cross turns his back on the end of the round, a throwing knife flies just past him into the door frame. The knife is similar to the throwing knives used by Knife Jack. The knife thrower escapes undetected via a balcony. Cross then threatens nightclub owner Snorry to "blow up his shop" if he doesn't name the knife thrower by the following night. At the nightclub, Cross meets singer Dolly Mooreland, who performs both at the nightclub and in a popular revue at the Coliseum theater. He thinks she is an accomplice of the gang and tries to get closer to her in a charming way. Cross is correct in his assumption. When she later enters her house, Toothpick Jeff and Whiskey Dick are already waiting there and discuss how to proceed towards Cross.

Inspector Sinclair, who has returned to London after three years in Canada, is also investigating the case. He was unrecognized at the Palermo the night before when Cross met Dolly Mooreland there. At Scotland Yard he meets Alice, Cross's wife, who reacts a little jealously to her husband's professional acquaintances with women. She asks Sinclair if she could visit the nightclub sometime. He replies: "But only with an escort!" Cross now suspects that another robbery by Messer-Jack's gang is to take place during the revue performance in the Coliseum Theater that evening. He goes to the theater unrecognized and knocks out Dolly's singing partner by leaving him tied up in the dressing room. In his costume he enters the stage with a daring jump. After a brief singing performance and another jump into a box where Jeff and Dick are waiting for the robbery to begin, Cross is able to thwart the act. The perpetrators escape after a chase through the theater to the roof over the rooftops of London.

In the further course of the evening, those involved meet in the Palermo nightclub. Inspector Sinclair came with Alice Cross. Dolly Moorehead dances with Josef Huber, who was smuggled into the Palermo by Inspector Sinclair as a spy. Jeff and Dick are also among the guests. In a side room, Sinclair and Alice meet Josef Huber, who discovered Messer-Jack's identity while on duty in the Palermo. Before he can tell them the name, he falls unconscious after drinking a whisky. Sinclair and Alice assume he is dead and exit the room, Sinclair locking the door. When Warrington arrives shortly thereafter, the supposed corpse has disappeared. The employees of the Palermo unanimously claim that Josef Huber left the room and the nightclub, albeit heavily intoxicated. Sinclair then arrests Dolly.

Cross believes the arrest to be a gross tactical error and asks Warrington for complete freedom to close the case. It is now known that Josef Huber was drowned when he was rescued from the Thames. No signs of poisoning were found on him. Dolly is released from custody by Cross. He follows her to lead him to Knife Jack. Arriving in the closed Palermo nightclub, she finds Jeff, Dick and Messer-Jack in the basement, whose identity is initially hidden from the viewer. Messer-Jack suspects their release is a trap and Cross is already on their trail. Jeff and Dick then leave the nightclub. A short time later, Cross appears and realizes that the nightclub owner is Snorry Messer-Jack. A bitter fight ensues in the guest room of empty Palermo. Cross manages to defeat Jack and Dolly. The arriving police led by Chief Inspector Warrington are able to arrest both of them.

Cast
Hans Albers as Sgt. Harry Cross
Charlotte Susa as Dolly Mooreland
Margot Landa as Alice Cross
Karl Ludwig Diehl as Snorry
Eugen Burg as Chief Insp. Warrington
Harry Hardt as Insp. Sinclair
Hermann Blaß as Prater-Pepi
Erich Schönfelder as Barker
John Mylong as Zahnstocher-Jeff
Hugo Fischer-Köppe as Whisky-Dick
Milo de Sabo as Tänzer-Jonny
Senta Söneland as Frau im Gefängnis
Hertha von Walther as Flossie
Wera Engels as Mabel
Leo Monosson as Stimmungssänger
Charlie Roellinghoff as Hausherr
Lotte Stein as Hausfrau
Peggy White as Zigarettenmädchen

References

External links

British crime films
Films of the Weimar Republic
German crime films
1930 crime films
Films directed by Richard Eichberg
Films set in London
Films shot at British International Pictures Studios
German multilingual films
British black-and-white films
German black-and-white films
British police films
1930s police procedural films
1930 multilingual films
1930s British films
1930s German films
Films set in country houses
Films set in nightclubs